National Route 294 is a national highway of Japan connecting Kashiwa, Chiba and Aizuwakamatsu, Fukushima in Japan, with a total length of 249.9 km (155.28 mi).

References

National highways in Japan
Roads in Chiba Prefecture
Roads in Fukushima Prefecture
Roads in Ibaraki Prefecture
Roads in Tochigi Prefecture